The 1883–84 season was the 11th season of competitive football in Scotland. This season saw the introduction of the British Home Championship, with Scotland winning the inaugural contest. In addition, two further regional competitions were played for the first time with the inaugural Forfarshire Cup and Stirlingshire Cup.

Honours

Cup honours

National 

Vale of Leven asked for a postponement to the date of the Scottish Cup Final due to bereavements, illness etc. but the Scottish Football Association refused and awarded the cup to Queen's Park.

County

Other

Scotland national team

Scotland won the inaugural British Home Championship after defeating Ireland, England and Wales

Notes

References

External links
Scottish Football Historical Archive

 
Seasons in Scottish football